NHS Dumfries and Galloway is an NHS board serving the Dumfries and Galloway region. It is one of the fourteen regions of NHS Scotland. NHS Dumfries and Galloway provides health care and promotes healthy living for the people of Dumfries and Galloway.

History 
The board was established following the dissolution of several NHS trusts which provided healthcare services in the Dumfries and Galloway area: Dumfries and Galloway Acute and Maternity Hospitals NHS Trust, Dumfries and Galloway Community Health NHS Trust and Dumfries and Galloway Primary Care NHS Trust, all of which were established in the 1990s and dissolved between 1999 and 2003.

In October 2021, Dumfries and Galloway Royal Infirmary was forced to suspend elective clinical procedures in order to be able to deal with the increased demand and staffing shortages which had been aggravated by Covid-19, but assured that urgent and cancer procedures would continue.

Services 
Dumfries and Galloway stretches from Langholm in the East to Stranraer in the West, and from Kirkconnel and Carsphairn in the North down to the Solway Coast. There are a number of Community Hospitals throughout the region, and an intermediate unit (including maternity services and medical & surgical beds) in Stranraer.

The board has been building an electronic shared cared record using Graphnet software which is designed to integrate primary and secondary care data for its patients in real time using its software.

Its headquarters are at Mountainhall Treatment Centre (Formerly Dumfries and Galloway Royal Infirmary), Dumfries.

Hospitals 
Within Dumfries
Dumfries and Galloway Royal Infirmary  Midpark Hospital
Outwith Dumfries
Annan Hospital  Castle Douglas Hospital  Galloway Community Hospital, Stranraer  Kirkcudbright Hospital  Lochmaben Hospital  Moffat Hospital  Newton Stewart Hospital  Thomas Hope Hospital, Langholm  Thornhill Hospital

Images

References

External links 

 

 
Organisations based in Dumfries and Galloway
Health in Dumfries and Galloway